SS Cape Island (AKR-10) was originally laid down for commercial service in 1976 as Illinois, a Type C7 ship for the States Lines. It was launched and then needed to be used for military service transferred into the Naval Vessel Register (NVR)  as the USNS Mercury, as transport ship for vehicles, and other goods. The ship was returned to Crowley Liner Services of Jacksonville, Florida. In 1993 the ship was permanently transferred to the navy's roll as a ready reserve ship, and renamed Cape Island (T-AKR-10). The Cape Island remains laid up in a ready reserve state so that it may be activated in five days, if called upon. The ship is currently moored in Tacoma, Washington.

Further reading
Ship's official page on Military Sealift Command
Ship photo index NavSource Online: Service Ship Photo Archive
Wikimapia site
Naval Vessel Register

References

Ships built in Bath, Maine
1976 ships